Clementino González Martínez (born 4 June 1990) is a Paraguayan footballer who plays as a forward.

References

External links
Profile at ESPN FC
Clementino González at BDFA

1990 births
Living people
Paraguayan footballers
Paraguayan expatriate footballers
Defensores de Cambaceres footballers
River Plate (Asunción) footballers
Central Español players
Liverpool F.C. (Montevideo) players
Independiente F.B.C. footballers
Uruguayan Primera División players
Paraguayan Primera División players
Uruguayan Segunda División players
Association football forwards
Paraguayan expatriate sportspeople in Argentina
Paraguayan expatriate sportspeople in Uruguay
Expatriate footballers in Argentina
Expatriate footballers in Uruguay